Tony Frank may refer to:

 Tony Frank (actor) (1943–2000), American actor
 Anthony A. Frank (born 1960), president of Colorado State University
 Anthony M. Frank (born 1931), United States Postmaster General